Baharestan (formerly known as Do Lengeh ) is a village in Jam Rural District of the Central District of Jam County, Bushehr province, Iran. At the 2006 census, its population was 3,125 in 684 households. The following census in 2011 counted 3,667 people in 902 households. The latest census in 2016 showed a population of 5,989 people in 1,507 households; it was the largest village in its rural district.

References 

Populated places in Jam County